Halyna Melnyk is a Ukrainian karateka. She won one of the bronze medals in the women's kumite 68 kg event at the 2019 European Games held in Minsk, Belarus.

In the same year, she also won the gold medal in the women's team kumite event at the 2019 European Karate Championships held in Guadalajara, Spain.

In June 2021, she competed at the World Olympic Qualification Tournament held in Paris, France hoping to qualify for the 2020 Summer Olympics in Tokyo, Japan. In November 2021, she won one of the bronze medals in the women's 68 kg event at the World Karate Championships held in Dubai, United Arab Emirates. She defeated Alisa Buchinger of Austria in her bronze medal match.

She competed in the women's kumite 68 kg event at the 2022 European Karate Championships held in Gaziantep, Turkey. She also competed in the women's kumite 68 kg event at the 2022 World Games held in Birmingham, United States.

Achievements

References 

Living people
Year of birth missing (living people)
Place of birth missing (living people)
Ukrainian female karateka
European Games medalists in karate
European Games bronze medalists for Ukraine
Karateka at the 2019 European Games
Competitors at the 2022 World Games
21st-century Ukrainian women